The Atlantic U-boat campaign of World War I (sometimes called the "First Battle of the Atlantic", in reference to the World War II campaign of that name) was the prolonged naval conflict between German submarines and the Allied navies in Atlantic waters—the seas around the British Isles, the North Sea and the coast of France.

Initially the U-boat campaign was directed against the British Grand Fleet. Later U-boat fleet action was extended to include action against the trade routes of the Allied powers. This campaign was highly destructive, and resulted in the loss of nearly half of Britain's merchant marine fleet during the course of the war. To counter the German submarines, the Allies moved shipping into convoys guarded by destroyers, blockades such as the Dover Barrage and minefields were laid, and aircraft patrols monitored the U-boat bases.

The U-boat campaign was not able to cut off supplies before the US entered the war in 1917 and in later 1918, the U-boat bases were abandoned in the face of the Allied advance.

The tactical successes and failures of the Atlantic U-boat Campaign would later be used as a set of available tactics in World War II in a similar U-boat war against the British Empire.

1914: Initial campaign

First patrols

The U-boats sailed north, hoping to encounter Royal Navy squadrons between Shetland and Bergen. On 8 August, one of U-9s engines broke down and she was forced to return to base. This failed to hit, and succeeded only in putting the battleships on their guard. At dawn the next morning, the 1st Light Cruiser Squadron, which was screening the battleships, came into contact with the U-boats.  sighting U-15, which was lying on the surface. There was no sign of any lookouts on the U-boat and sounds of hammering could be heard, as though her crew were performing repairs. Birmingham immediately altered course and rammed U-15 just behind her conning tower. The submarine was cut in two and sank with all hands.

On 12 August, seven U-boats returned to Heligoland; U-13 was also missing, and it was thought she had been mined. While the operation was a failure, it caused the Royal Navy some uneasiness, disproving earlier estimates as to U-boats' radius of action and leaving the security of the Grand Fleet's unprotected anchorage at Scapa Flow open to question. On the other hand, the ease with which U-15 had been destroyed by Birmingham encouraged the false belief that submarines were no great danger to surface warships.

First successes

On 5 September 1914,  commanded by Lieutenant Otto Hersing made history when he torpedoed the Royal Navy light cruiser . The cruiser's magazine exploded, and the ship sank in four minutes, taking 259 of her crew with her. It was the first combat victory of the modern submarine.

The German U-boats were to get even luckier on 22 September. Early in the morning of that day, a lookout on the bridge of U-9, commanded by Lieutenant Otto Weddigen, spotted a vessel on the horizon. Weddigen ordered the U-boat to submerge immediately, and the submarine went forward to investigate. These three vessels were not merely antiquated, but were staffed mostly by reservists, and were so clearly vulnerable that a decision to withdraw them was already filtering up through the bureaucracy of the Admiralty. The order did not come soon enough for the ships. Weddigen sent one torpedo into Aboukir. The captains of Hogue and Cressy assumed Aboukir had struck a mine and came up to assist. U-9 put two torpedoes into Hogue, and then hit Cressy with two more torpedoes as the cruiser tried to flee. The three cruisers sank in less than an hour, killing 1,460 British sailors.

Three weeks later, on 15 October, Weddigen also sank the old cruiser , and the crew of U-9 became national heroes. Each was awarded the Iron Cross Second Class, except for Weddigen, who received the Iron Cross First Class. The sinkings caused alarm within the British Admiralty, which was increasingly nervous about the security of the Scapa Flow anchorage, and the fleet was sent to ports in Ireland and the west coast of Scotland until adequate defenses were installed at Scapa Flow. This, in a sense, was a more significant victory than sinking a few old cruisers; the world's most powerful fleet had been forced to abandon its home base.
On 18 October, SM U-27 sank HMS E3, the first instance of one submarine sinking another.

End of the first campaign
These concerns were well-founded. On 23 November U-18 penetrated Scapa Flow via Hoxa Sound, following a steamer through the boom and entering the anchorage with little difficulty. However, the fleet was absent, being dispersed in anchorages on the west coast of Scotland and Ireland. As U-18 was making her way back out to the open sea, her periscope was spotted by a guard boat. The trawler Dorothy Gray altered course and rammed the periscope, rendering it unserviceable. U-18 then suffered a failure of her diving plane motor and the boat became unable to maintain her depth, at one point even impacting the seabed. Eventually, her captain was forced to surface and scuttle his command, and all but one crew-member were picked up by British boats.

The last success of the year came on 31 December. U-24 sighted the British battleship  on manoeuvres in the English Channel and torpedoed her. Formidable sank with the loss of 547 of her crew. The C-in-C Channel Fleet, Adm. Sir Lewis Bayly, was criticized for not taking proper precautions during the exercises, but was cleared of the charge of negligence. Bayly later served with distinction as commander of the anti-submarine warfare forces at Queenstown.

1915: War on commerce

First attacks on merchant ships

The first attacks on merchant ships had started in October 1914. On 20 October  became the first British merchant vessel to be sunk by a German submarine in World War I. Glitra, bound from Grangemouth to Stavanger, Norway, was stopped and searched by U-17, under the command of Kapitänleutnant Johannes Feldkirchener. The operation was performed broadly in accordance with the cruiser rules, the crew being ordered into the lifeboats before Glitra was sunk by having her seacocks opened. It was the first time in history a submarine sank a merchant ship.

Less than a week later, on 26 October, U-24 became the first submarine to attack an unarmed merchant ship without warning, when she torpedoed the steamship , with 2,500 Belgian refugees aboard. Although the ship did not sink, and was towed into Boulogne, 40 people died, mainly due to panic. The U-boat's commander, Rudolf Schneider, claimed he had mistaken her for a troop transport.

On 30 January 1915, commanded by Kapitänleutnant Otto Dröscher, torpedoed and sank the steamships ,  and  without warning, and on 1 February fired a torpedo at, but missed, the hospital ship , despite her being clearly identifiable as a hospital ship by her white paintwork with green bands and red crosses.

Unrestricted submarine warfare

Britons believed before the war that the United Kingdom would starve without North American food; W. T. Stead wrote in 1901 that without it "We should be face to face with famine". On 4 February 1915, the first unrestricted campaign against Allied trade was started. The U-boat had several deficiencies for a commerce raider; its low speed, even on the surface, made it scarcely faster than many merchant ships, while its light gun armament was inadequate against larger vessels. To use the U-boat's chief weapon, the attack without warning, using torpedoes, meant abandoning the stop-and-search required to avoid harming neutrals.

In the first month 29 ships totalling  were sunk, a pace of destruction which was maintained throughout the summer. As the sinkings increased, so too did the number of politically damaging incidents. On 19 February, U-8 torpedoed Belridge, a neutral tanker travelling between two neutral ports; in March U-boats sank Hanna and Medea, a Swedish and a Dutch freighter; in April two Greek vessels.

In March also, Falaba was sunk, with the loss of one US life, and in April Harpalyce, a Belgian Relief ship, was sunk. On 7 May, U-20 sank  with the loss of 1,198 lives, 128 of them US citizens. These incidents caused outrage amongst neutrals and the scope of the unrestricted campaign was scaled back in September 1915 to lessen the risk of those nations entering the war against Germany.

British countermeasures were largely ineffective. The most effective defensive measures proved to be advising merchantmen to turn towards the U-boat and attempt to ram, forcing it to submerge. Over half of all attacks on merchant ships by U-boats were defeated in this way. This response freed the U-boat to attack without warning, however. For this her captain, Charles Fryatt, was executed after being captured by the Germans in June 1916 provoking international condemnation.

Another option was arming ships for self-defence, which, according to the Germans, put them outside the protection of the cruiser rules.

Another option was to arm and man decoy ships with hidden guns, the so-called Q-ship. A variant on the idea was to equip small vessels with a submarine escort. In 1915, three U-boats were sunk by Q-ships, and two more by submarines accompanying trawlers. In June also  was sunk by  while attacking Taranaki, and in July U-23 was sunk by C-27 attacking Princess Louise.

There were, however, no means to detect submerged U-boats, and attacks on them were limited to efforts to damage their periscopes with hammers and dropping guncotton bombs. Use of nets to ensnare U-boats was also examined, as was a destroyer, fitted with a spar torpedo.

In all, 16 U-boats were destroyed during this phase of the campaign, while they themselves sank 370 ships totalling 750,000 GRT.

1916: In support of the High Seas fleet
In 1916 the German Navy returned to a strategy of using the U-boats to erode the Grand Fleet's numerical superiority by staging a series of operations designed to lure the Grand Fleet into a U-boat trap. Due to the U-boats' poor speed compared to the main battle fleet these operations required U-boat patrol lines to be set up, while the High Seas fleet manoeuvred to draw the Grand Fleet to them.

Several of these operations were staged, in March and April 1916, but with no success. Ironically, the major fleet action which did take place, the Battle of Jutland, in May 1916, saw no U-boat involvement at all; the fleets met and engaged largely by chance, and there were no U-boat patrols anywhere near the battle area. A further series of operations, in August and October 1916, were similarly unfruitful, and the strategy was abandoned in favour of resuming commerce warfare.

1917: Renewed "unrestricted" campaign

In 1917 Germany decided to resume full unrestricted submarine warfare. It was expected to bring America into the war, but the Germans gambled that they could defeat Britain by this means before the US could mobilize. German planners estimated that if the sunk tonnage were to exceed 600,000 tons per month, Britain would be forced to sue for peace after five to six months.

In February 1917 U-boats sank over 414,000 GRT in the war zone around Britain, 80% of the total for the month; in March they sank over 500,000 (90%), in April over 600,000 of 860,000 GRT, the highest total sinkings of the war. This, however was the high point.

In May, the first convoys were introduced, and were immediately successful. Overall losses started to fall; losses to ships in convoy fell dramatically. In the three months following their introduction, on the Atlantic, North Sea, and Scandinavian routes, of 8,894 ships convoyed just 27 were lost to U-boats. By comparison 356 were lost sailing independently.

As shipping losses fell, U-boat losses rose; during the period May to July 1917, 15 U-boats were destroyed in the waters around Britain, compared to 9 the previous quarter, and 4 for the quarter before the campaign was renewed.

As the campaign became more intense, it also became more brutal. 1917 saw a series of attacks on hospital ships, which generally sailed fully lit, to show their non-combatant status.

As U-boats became more wary, encounters with Q-ships also became more intense. In March Privet sank U-85 in a 40-minute gun battle, but herself sank before reaching harbour.

In April Heather was attacked by U-52 and was badly damaged; the U-boat escaped unscathed. And a few days later Tulip was sunk by  whose captain was suspicious of her appearance.

1918: Final year
The convoy system was effective in reducing allied shipping losses, while better weapons and tactics made the escorts more successful at intercepting and attacking U-boats. Shipping losses in Atlantic waters were 98 ships (just over 170,000 GRT) in January; after a rise in February they fell again, and did not rise above that level for the rest of the war.

In January, six U-boats were destroyed in the theatre; this also became the average loss for the year.

The Allies continued to try to block access through the Straits of Dover, with the Dover Barrage. Until November 1917 it was ineffective; up to then just two U-boats had been destroyed by the Barrage force, and the Barrage itself had been a magnet for surface raids. After major improvement in the winter of 1917 it became more effective; in the four-month period after mid-December seven U-boats were destroyed trying to transit the area, and by February the High Seas Flotilla boats had abandoned the route in favour of sailing north-about round Scotland, with a consequent loss of effectiveness. The Flanders boats still tried to use the route, but continued to suffer losses, and after March switched their operations to Britain's east coast.

Other measures, particularly against the Flanders flotilla, were the raids on Zeebrugge and Ostend, an attempt to blockade access to the sea. These were largely unsuccessful; the Flanders boats were able to maintain access throughout this period.

May 1918 saw the only attempt by the Germans to muster a group attack, the forerunner of the wolf-pack, to counter the Allied convoys.

On 11 May, U-86 sank one of a pair of ships detached from a convoy in the Channel, but the next day an attack on the troopship  led to the destruction of U-103, while  was sunk by British submarine . Two more ships were sunk in convoys in the next week, and three independents, but over 100 ships had passed safely through the group's patrol area.

During the summer, the extension of the convoy system and effectiveness of the escorts made the east coast of Britain as dangerous for the U-boats as the Channel had become. In this period, the Flanders flotilla lost a third of its boats, and in the autumn, losses were at 40%. In October, with the German army in full retreat, the Flanders flotilla was forced to abandon its base at Bruges before it was overrun. A number of boats were scuttled there, while the remainder, just ten boats, returned to bases in Germany.

In the summer, too, steps were taken to reduce the effectiveness of the High Seas Flotillas. In 1918, the Allies, particularly the US, undertook to create a barrage across the Norwegian Sea, to block U-boat access to the Western Approaches by the north-about route. This huge undertaking involved laying and maintaining minefields and patrols in deep waters over a distance of 300 nautical miles (556 kilometers). The North Sea Mine Barrage saw the laying of over 70,000 mines, mostly by the United States Navy, during the summer of 1918. From September to November 1918, six U-boats were sunk by this measure.

In July 1918,  sailed to Massachusetts and took part in the Attack on Orleans for about an hour. This was the first time that US soil was attacked by a foreign power's artillery since the Siege of Fort Texas in 1846 and one of two places in North America to be subject to attack by the Central Powers. The other was the Battle of Ambos Nogales that was allegedly led by two German spies.

On 20 October 1918 Germany suspended submarine warfare, and on 11 November 1918, World War I ended. The last task of the U-Boat Arm was in helping to quell the Wilhelmshaven mutiny, which had broken out when the High Seas Fleet was ordered to sea for a final, doomed sortie. After the Armistice, the remaining U-boats joined the High Seas Fleet in surrender, and were interned at Harwich.

Of the 12.5 million tons of Allied shipping destroyed in World War I, over 8 million tons, two-thirds of the total, had been sunk in the waters of the Atlantic war zone. Of the 178 U-boats destroyed during the war, 153 had been from the Atlantic forces, 77 from the much larger High Seas Flotillas and 76 from the much smaller Flanders force.

See also
 Mediterranean U-boat campaign of World War I

Notes

References
 
 
 
 
 
 
 
 
 Holwitt, Joel I. "Execute Against Japan", PhD dissertation, Ohio State University, 2005.
 McKee, Fraser M. "An Explosive Story: The Rise and Fall of the Depth Charge", in The Northern Mariner (III, #1, January 1993), pp. 45–58.

External links
 Abbatiello, John: Atlantic U-boat Campaign , in: 1914-1918-online. International Encyclopedia of the First World War.
 Karau, Mark D.: Submarines and Submarine Warfare , in: 1914-1918-online. International Encyclopedia of the First World War.

U-boats
U-boat Campaign (World War I)
Atlantic operations of World War I